The Coco Islands are a small group of islands in the northeastern Bay of Bengal. They are part of the Yangon Region of Myanmar. Coco Island group consists of 5 islands, 4 islands on Great Coco Reef and another raicoco island on the Little Coco Reef. To the north of this island group lies Preparis Island also belonging to Myanmar, and to the south lies the Landfall Island belonging to India.

History
The islands took their current name from Portuguese sailors in the 16th century, "coco" being the Portuguese word for the coconut. The Andaman Islands were taken over by the English East India Company in the 18th century. In the 19th century, the British government in India established a penal colony in the Andamans, and the Coco Islands were a source of food for it (mainly coconuts).

In 1959, General Ne Win's interim military administration established a penal colony on Great Coco Island. After Ne Win’s 1962 coup d'état and subsequent installation of a military government, the prison gained the reputation of being a Burmese "Devil’s Island". In 1969, it was enlarged to house an increased number of political prisoners. After a strike, all prisoners on the island were transferred to Rangoon’s Insein Prison in 1971. After the closing of the penal colony, the facilities on Great Coco Island were transferred to the Burmese Navy.
Burmese writer Mya Than Tint was among the people incarcerated at the Great Coco Island penal colony.

The Coco Islands were allegedly leased to the People's Republic of China from 1994. The governments of Burma and the People's Republic of China deny this, and many members of the Burmese military categorically deny any agreement at all.

Military
China supposedly established a SIGINT intelligence gathering station on Great Coco Island in 1992 to monitor Indian naval activity in the Andaman and Nicobar Islands. The station is also said to allow China to monitor the movement of other navies and ships throughout the eastern Indian Ocean, especially in the crucial point for shipping routes between the Bay of Bengal and the Strait of Malacca. It may also be used to monitor activities at the launch site of the Indian Space Research Organisation at Sriharikota and the Defence Research and Development Organisation at Chandipur-on-sea. In a 2008 report, it's claimed that the Chinese Army has future plans of building a maritime base on Little Coco Island.

The alleged existence of the Chinese base has been questioned. In 1998, the United States stated that it had not detected any significant Chinese activity in Burma. In October 2005, India’s Chief of Naval Staff was quoted as saying that India had "firm information that there is no listening post, radar or surveillance station belonging to the Chinese on Coco Islands". In 2014, Air Marshal P. K. Roy, commander-in-chief of India's Andaman and Nicobar Command, stated that "China has been developing a runway for civilian purposes. There are no reports of the presence of Chinese per se. The situation is not alarming". He added that there was only some civilian infrastructural developments, which were not a threat to India.

Geography
The Bay of Bengal lies to the west of the islands, and the Andaman Sea lies to the east.
The Coco Islands consist of three main islands, namely Great Coco Island and the smaller Little Coco Island, separated by the Alexandra Channel, as well as Table Island, a third small island located near Great Coco Island.

Great Coco reef
This reef has four islands, from north to south those are Slipper Island, Table Island, Great Coco Island and Jerry Island.

Great Coco Island
The Coco Islands consist of three main islands: Great Coco Island and the smaller Little Coco Island are separated by the Alexandra Channel, as well as a third small island located near Great Coco Island is Table Island.

Many green turtles nest on the beaches of the Island. A series of research programs on marine turtle conservation have been conducted by Myanmar's Ministry of Livestock, Fisheries and Rural Development. Data collection on tissue samples of green turtles for population genetic and tagging studies was conducted at Great Coco Island in March and April, 2006. Previously, Great Coco Island had never been surveyed for marine turtle conservation due to its remote location. The survey found an estimated 150 sea turtles nesting along with 95,000 hatchlings and juveniles.

Table Island
The island previously housed a lighthouse in its southwestern portion, but it is now uninhabited. The lighthouse was built is 1867, with a focal plane of 59 m. It has a lantern and gallery, painted with red and white horizontal bands. Two 1-story brick keeper's houses and other light station buildings lie around the lighthouse.

The island is accessible by boat. One of the former island keepers was brutally murdered by his boss.

Slipper Island

Jerry Island

Little Coco Reef
This reef has only one island.

Little Coco Island
This island is on a separate reef, and rest of the four islands (including Table Island) are on the same reef as Coco Island. This is the southernmost Island belonging to Myanmar in Andaman and Nicobar sea, the next island to the south is Landfall Island belonging to India.

General information

Demography
There are more than 200 houses on Great Coco Island, and its total population is around a thousand people. A large water catchment reservoir is able to support the island's population.

There is a naval base on the islands, which belongs to the 28th unit of the Myanmar Navy. It is home to some 200 soldiers and their families.

Climate
The Coco Islands have a tropical monsoon climate (Köppen climate classification Am). Temperatures are very warm throughout the year. There is a winter dry season from December to March and a summer wet season from April to November.

Administration
The island belongs to the township of Cocokyun. The township had a corruption scandal in the Myanmar general election of 2015. Ballots were filled in Yangon without being shipped, resulting in a high turnout and subsequent police investigation.

Transportation
The  Coco Island Airport (ICAO code: VYCI) is at the north of Great Coco Island. It follows the north–south axis near the island's village. The airport was recently renovated. Newspapers claim the airport has some use as a Chinese Air Force base.

Flora and fauna
The islands offer the opportunity to see rare reptiles, birds, and mammals that are unique to the Coco Islands.

Image gallery

See also
 Exclusive economic zones
 Exclusive economic zone of India
 Exclusive economic zone of Indonesia
 Exclusive economic zone of Malaysia
 Exclusive economic zone of Thailand
 India's Look-East Connectivity projects
 Sabang strategic port development, India-Indonesia project
 Sittwe Port, India-Myanmar project
 Dawei Port Project in Myanmar

 Extreme points
 Rondo Island, Indonesia's northernmost island is closest to Indira Point
 Narcondam Island, India's easternmost point of Andaman Nicobar Islands group
 Landfall Island, India's northernmost island of Andaman Nicobar Islands group
 Extreme points of India
 Extreme points of Indonesia
 Extreme points of Myanmar
 Extreme points of Bangladesh
 Extreme points of Thailand
 List of islands of Burma

 Borders of Myanmar
 Bangladesh–Myanmar border
 China–Myanmar border
 India–Myanmar border
 Laos–Myanmar border
 Thailand–Myanmar border

References 

 Burma's mythical islands
Official Nautical Chart of Coco Islands
Indian Ocean – South-East Asian Marine Turtle Memorandum of Understanding
Google Earth map of Chinese facilities at Great Coco Island

Populated places in Myanmar
Islands of Myanmar
Islands of the Indian Ocean